Wan'an is a town under the administration of Xinjiang County, Shanxi, China. , it has 13 villages under its administration.

References 

Township-level divisions of Shanxi
Xinjiang County